Aka Aka is a rural locality on the Aka Aka Stream, a tributary of the Waikato River. It lies about 7 km southeast of Waiuku.

The area was originally a swamp, drained in the late 19th century.

The New Zealand Co-operative Dairy Company has a factory in Aka Aka, built in 1901.

The current Aka Aka Hall, opened in 2002, contains a Roll of Honour commemorating people from the area killed in the first and second world wars. The hall replaced one which was described as a "splendid new hall" in 1912.

Demographics
Aka Aka statistical area covers all of the Waikato District north of the Waikato River and west of the Tutaenui Stream, and includes Otaua.

Aka Aka had a population of 3,102 at the 2018 New Zealand census, an increase of 465 people (17.6%) since the 2013 census, and an increase of 546 people (21.4%) since the 2006 census. There were 1,047 households, comprising 1,584 males and 1,518 females, giving a sex ratio of 1.04 males per female. The median age was 42.2 years (compared with 37.4 years nationally), with 639 people (20.6%) aged under 15 years, 573 (18.5%) aged 15 to 29, 1,479 (47.7%) aged 30 to 64, and 408 (13.2%) aged 65 or older.

Ethnicities were 92.6% European/Pākehā, 11.7% Māori, 2.4% Pacific peoples, 4.2% Asian, and 1.5% other ethnicities. People may identify with more than one ethnicity.

The percentage of people born overseas was 15.7, compared with 27.1% nationally.

Although some people chose not to answer the census's question about religious affiliation, 59.0% had no religion, 30.8% were Christian, 0.3% had Māori religious beliefs, 0.4% were Hindu, 0.4% were Muslim, 0.2% were Buddhist and 1.7% had other religions.

Of those at least 15 years old, 381 (15.5%) people had a bachelor's or higher degree, and 477 (19.4%) people had no formal qualifications. The median income was $39,200, compared with $31,800 nationally. 615 people (25.0%) earned over $70,000 compared to 17.2% nationally. The employment status of those at least 15 was that 1,485 (60.3%) people were employed full-time, 402 (16.3%) were part-time, and 36 (1.5%) were unemployed.

Education 

There is also a primary school at Otaua.

References 

Waikato District
Populated places in Waikato
Populated places on the Waikato River